Ambernath Assembly constituency is one of the 288 Vidhan Sabha (legislative assembly) constituencies of Maharashtra state, western India. This constituency is located in Thane district.

Geographical scope
The constituency comprises parts of Ambernath taluka viz. revenue circles Ambernath (Rural),
and Ambernath Municipal Council, parts of Ulhasnagar taluka that is parts of Ulhasnagar Municipal Corporation that is wards 14 to 22 and 44 to 51.

List of Members of Legislative Assembly

Election results

Assembly Elections 1978

Assembly Elections 1980

Assembly Elections 1985

Assembly Elections 1990

Assembly Elections 1995

Assembly Elections 1999

Assembly Elections 2004

Assembly Elections 2009

Assembly Elections 2014

Assembly Elections 2019

References

Assembly constituencies of Thane district
Assembly constituencies of Maharashtra
Ambarnath